The High Speed Rail (West Midlands - Crewe) Act 2021 is an Act of Parliament passed by the Parliament of the United Kingdom passed on 11 February 2021 to give the legislative framework for the first stage of High Speed 2 between the West Midlands and Crewe, Cheshire.

References 

United Kingdom Acts of Parliament 2021
2021 in British law
2021 in British politics
Railway Acts
High Speed 2